
Gmina Solina is a rural gmina (administrative district) in Lesko County, Subcarpathian Voivodeship, in south-eastern Poland. The present seat is Polańczyk.

The gmina contains parts of the protected areas called Cisna-Wetlina Landscape Park and San Valley Landscape Park.

Villages
Gmina Solina contains the villages and settlements of Berezka, Bereźnica Wyżna, Bóbrka, Bukowiec, Górzanka, Jawor, Myczków, Myczkowce, Polańczyk, Rajskie, Rybne, Solina, Terka, Werlas, Wola Matiaszowa, Wołkowyja and Zawóz.

Neighbouring gminas
Gmina Solina is bordered by the gminas of Baligród, Cisna, Czarna, Lesko, Olszanica and Ustrzyki Dolne.

References
Polish official population figures 2006

Solina
Lesko County